= Bommidoddi =

- Village
- Country: India
- State: Andhra Pradesh
- District: chittoor
- Mandal: Palamaner

Languages
  - Official: Telugu
- Time zone: UTC+5:30 (IST)

Bommidoddi is a village in Chittoor district of the Indian state of Andhra Pradesh. It is located in Palamaner mandal.
